Bishop Vitaliy Kryvytskyi or Vitaliy Krivitskiy, S.D.B. (born 19 August 1972 in Odessa, Ukrainian SSR) is a Ukrainian Roman Catholic prelate as the diocesan bishop of Kyiv–Zhytomyr since 30 April 2017.

Life
Bishop Kryvytskyi was born in the Polish family of Frants Kryvytskyi (Krzywicki) in the Southern Ukraine. His Christian life was inspired by Fr. Tadeusz Hoppe, S.D.B. After graduation of the school education in his native city, joined the Salesians of Don Bosco in 1989; he made a profession on 1 January 1991 and a solemn profession on 27 July 1996, and was ordained as priest on 24 May 1997, after graduation of the Major Theological Seminary in Grodno, Belarus (1990–1991) and Major Theological Salesian Seminary in Kraków, Poland (1991–1997). In the same time he studied at the Catholic University of Lublin.

Fr. Kryvytskyi returned to Ukraine in 1997 and began to work in the Salesian parishes as a superior of the different local communities and youth animator in Odessa, Zhytomyr Oblast and Lviv Oblast.

On 30 April 2017 he was appointed by the Pope Francis as the Diocesan Bishop of the Kyiv–Zhytomyr. On 24 June 2017 he was consecrated as bishop by Archbishop Claudio Gugerotti, Apostolic Nuncio to Ukraine and other prelates of the Roman Catholic Church in the Co-Cathedral of St. Alexander in Kyiv.

References

1972 births
Living people
Clergy from Odesa
John Paul II Catholic University of Lublin alumni
Ukrainian people of Polish descent
21st-century Roman Catholic bishops in Ukraine
Roman Catholic bishops of Kyiv
Salesian bishops